Kyung-joon, also spelled Kyung-jun or Kyoung-jun, is a Korean masculine given name. Its meaning differs based on the hanja used to write each syllable of the name. There are 54 hanja with the reading kyung and 34 hanja with the reading "joon" on the South Korean government's official list of hanja which may be registered for use in given names.

Jeon Kyung-jun (born 1973), South Korean football player
Kim Kyung-Jun (born 1987), South Korean violinist
Ko Kyung-joon (born 1987), South Korean football player
Ou Kyoung-jun (born 1987), South Korean footballer
Kim Kyung-joon (businessman), one of the principals in the 2007 BBK stock price manipulation incident tied to South Korean president Lee Myung-bak
Lee Kyoung-jun, South Korean management professor

Fictional characters with this name include:
Kang Kyung-joon, in 2012 South Korean television series Big

See also
List of Korean given names

References

Korean masculine given names